Leonela Mojica Guzmán (born 28 August 1987) is a Dominican footballer who plays as a midfielder. She has been a member of the Dominican Republic women's national team.

International career
Mojica represented the Dominican Republic at the 2004 CONCACAF U-19 Women's Qualifying Tournament. At senior level, she capped during the 2010 CONCACAF Women's World Cup Qualifying qualification and the 2012 CONCACAF Women's Olympic Qualifying Tournament (and its qualifying).

References 

1987 births
Living people
Women's association football midfielders
Dominican Republic women's footballers
Dominican Republic women's international footballers